The 2020 Maine State Senate election was held on Tuesday, November 3, 2020, with the primary election using instant-runoff voting being held on July 14, 2020, to elect the 130th Maine Senate. Voters in all 35 districts of the Maine State Senate will elect their senators. The elections will coincide with the elections for other offices, including for U.S. President, U.S. Senate, U.S. House and the Maine House of Representatives. Republicans only needed to gain four seats to win control of the chamber; they instead gained only one and lost another two, resulting in a net increase in the Democratic Party's majority.

The primary elections were held on July 14, 2020.

Background 
In the 2018 Maine State Senate elections, Democrats gained control of Maine State Senate by a 21–14 margin. Before those elections, Republicans had controlled the chamber since 2014 Maine State Senate elections.

Predictions

Results

Overview

Closest races 
Seats where the margin of victory was under 10%:
  gain
  gain

Detailed results 

Source: Official candidate listings.

District 1

District 2

District 3

District 4

District 5

District 6

District 7

District 8

District 9

District 10

District 11

District 12

District 13

District 14

District 15

District 16

District 17

District 18

District 19

District 20

District 21

District 22

District 23

District 24

District 25

District 26

District 27

District 28

District 29

District 30

District 31

District 32

District 33

District 34

District 35

See also
 2020 Maine elections

References

External links
 Elections & Voting division of the Maine Secretary of State
 
 
  (State affiliate of the U.S. League of Women Voters)
 

State Senate
Maine State Senate
Maine Senate elections